The Civic Party of Kazakhstan (QAP) is a defunct political party in Kazakhstan that was led by First Secretary Azat Peruashev. The QAP was formed in 1998 and existed until 2006 when it was merged with Otan.

History
The founding congress of the QAP was held on 17 November 1998 in the city of Aktobe. The party's program and charter were adopted at the congress and Azat Peruashev was elected as the party's First Secretary. On 29 December 1998, it was registered by the Ministry of Justice. The QAP advocated the construction of a democratic rule of law, the formation of civil society institutions, the strengthening and development of statehood. Most of the members of the QAP consisted of workers and employees of the largest enterprises of the mining and metallurgical industries. The main organ of the party was the Central Committee. The party had branches in all regions of the country, as well as in Astana and Almaty.

The QAP won one seat in the 1999 legislative elections from a single-member constituency and 2 from the party list.

The party participated in the Agrarian and Industrial Union of Workers Bloc that won 7.1% of the popular vote and 11 out of 77 seats in the 2004 Kazakh legislative election. The elections were held on 19 September and 3 October.

QAP held a party congress on 10 November 2006. First Secretary Peruashev and President Nursultan Nazarbayev both attended. Peruashev announced that QAP officially merged into Otan, the largest political party in Kazakhstan and the party of Nazarbayev, justifying the move by saying that "the interests of the nation" must take precedence. Nazarbayev said he expected other parties to merge with Otan. Nazarbayev said there should be fewer, stronger parties that "efficiently defend the interests of the population."

References

Defunct political parties in Kazakhstan